Charlotte Baden (21 November 1740 – 6 June 1824) was a Danish writer, feminist and letter-writer.

Sophia Lovisa Charlotte Baden was the daughter of major Gustav Ludvig von Klenau (1703–72) and Bolette Cathrine From (1696-1788). She was brought up by her relative Anna Susanne von der Osten (1704-1773), head lady-in-waiting to Princess Charlotte Amalie of Denmark, who financed her education and gave her a pension.  In 1763, she married Jacob Baden (1735-1804), who was a professor at the University of Copenhagen.

 Work
 Den fortsatte Grandison (1784)

References

Related reading
Katharina M. Wilson (1991) An Encyclopedia of Continental Women Writers (Taylor & Francis) 

1740 births
1824 deaths
18th-century Danish writers
18th-century Danish women writers
Danish feminists